Gabriella Bascelli (born 19 August 1982) is an Italian rower. She competed at the 2004 Summer Olympics and the 2008 Summer Olympics.

References

External links
 

1982 births
Living people
Italian female rowers
Olympic rowers of Italy
Rowers at the 2004 Summer Olympics
Rowers at the 2008 Summer Olympics
Rowers from Johannesburg